My Destiny In Your Hands is a 1963 Brazilian drama film written, directed by, and starring José Mojica Marins. Marins is also known by his alter ego Zé do Caixão (in English, Coffin Joe).

Synopsis
A husband comes home drunk and beats his wife. His son Carlito tries to defend his mother with a broomstick. The father turns to the boy menacingly and threatens "I'll kill you!". Terrified, the boy flees with four other young children, all poor and suffering abuse and exploitation at home by their families. The children try to live and survive life on the streets on the outskirts of São Paulo.

Carlito (Franquito), the eldest of them, plays guitar and sings to make money.   Marins composed three of the ten songs composed for Carlito in the film.

Cast
Alvino Cassiano	
Augusto de Cervantes
Carmem Marins		
Delmo Demarcos		
Franquito as Carlito	
José Mojica Marins as the Father	
Mário Lima
Nivaldo de Lima
Nilton Batista
Nivaldo Guimarães

References

External links 
Official film site

Meu Destino em Tuas Mãos on Portal Heco de Cinema

1963 Western (genre) films
1963 films
Brazilian Western (genre) films
Films directed by José Mojica Marins
1960s Portuguese-language films